Siegfried "Zig" Engelmann (November 26, 1931 – February 15, 2019) was an American educationalist who co-developed the approach to instruction termed "Direct Instruction" (DI). Engelmann was Professor Emeritus of Education at the University of Oregon and Director of the National Institute for Direct Instruction. He wrote more than 100 curricula using DI principles and numerous other books and articles.

Biography
Siegfried Engelmann was born November 26, 1931 in Chicago, Illinois. After graduating with class honors in philosophy from the University of Illinois in 1955, he spent time in a variety of occupations, from working in exploratory oil drilling to being a science editor. While working as a marketing director in the early 1960s, Engelmann became interested with how children learn. This interest began with examining how much exposure was required for a young child to learn a motto or an advertising theme and what effects reinforcing presentations would have on learning rates. He began working with preschoolers, including his own children, focusing first on topics related to advertising and then on more academic content. In 1964, he left his job in advertising and became a research associate at the Institute for Research on Exceptional Children at the University of Illinois at Champaign-Urbana, working with Carl Bereiter. In 1970, he moved from the University of Illinois to the University of Oregon in Eugene, becoming a Professor in the University's College of Education.

The Theory of Instruction
In addition to developing curriculum, Engelmann wrote 19 books as well as scholarly articles and other reports of his experiments on teaching and learning. In a book called The Theory of Instruction, Engelmann and Douglas Carnine summarized the theoretical basis of the Direct Instruction approach. They analyzed three components of cognitive learning: behavior, communication, and knowledge systems. They proposed that the mechanism by which humans learn involves two attributes. First, they postulated that individuals can learn any quality, defined as an irreducible feature, from examples. People are limited in this ability only by their sensory capabilities. The second attribute involves how learning occurs, and involves the notion of generalizing from examples. Learners have the capacity to develop “rules” or “understandings” about common qualities to a set of examples. As soon as learners are presented with information, they begin to formulate such rules. This is done by noting what is equivalent or “same” about the various examples that are given. Once the learner has determined what is the same about the examples of the concept or quality, generalization occurs.

The Bereiter-Engelmann Preschool
At the University of Illinois, Bereiter had a grant to accelerate the development of young children, and Engelmann worked with him on that project. In the summer of 1964, they opened a program for "culturally disadvantaged" preschoolers, which became known as the Bereiter-Engelmann Preschool. Their goal was to demonstrate the extent to which disadvantaged children could accelerate their learning beyond the performance of middle class students and thus have a better chance of success in school.
At the preschool, Engelmann trained other teachers to work with the children. Engelmann developed scripted lessons that provided the exact wording for teachers to use, sequenced the learning in the most effective manner, and provided guidelines for checking children's responses and providing appropriate corrections and reinforcements. The scripts allowed teachers to focus on their interaction with the children.

Tests of Direct Instruction efficacy 
Engelmann authored more than 100 curricular programs based on the principles that were discovered in the Bereiter-Engelmann Preschool. The first programs, written from 1968 through 1970, were called DISTAR, for Direct Instruction System for Teaching and Remediation, and were designed to teach reading, math, and language to children in kindergarten through second grade. The DISTAR materials were used in some locations that participated in Project Follow Through, the largest educational experiment in the history of the United States. Follow Through, which was sponsored by the U.S. Office of Education, began in 1968 and continued into the 1970s. The project targeted primary school children in communities with high levels of poverty. The DISTAR materials demonstrated the highest gains in the study.

In subsequent years, the original DISTAR programs were expanded from the original three levels to include six levels. These programs are currently called Reading Mastery and Connecting Math Concepts. Engelmann also developed a multilevel reading program for students beyond the primary level, including adults, who performed lower than others (Corrective Reading Decoding and Corrective Reading Comprehension), programs to teach writing and spelling (Reasoning and Writing and Spelling Mastery), and a videodisc series to teach math and science to middle school students (including Chemistry and Energy and Elementary Earth Science). Programs were also written for parents to use with their children, such as Teach Your Child to Read in 100 Easy Lessons and Give your Child a Superior Mind. Engelmann also developed computer-based programs for parents and others to teach young children reading and math skills (Funnix Beginning Reading and Funnix Beginning Math), as well as programs to teach English speaking skills to non-native English speakers at third grade or older (Direct Instruction Spoken English).

"The Pet Goat"

"The Pet Goat" is a reading exercise from the 1995 children's workbook Reading Mastery II: Storybook 1 by Engelmann and fellow DISTAR instructional designer Elaine C. Bruner (who later worked on the PLATO education project). It gained attention on September 11, 2001: U.S. President George W. Bush was reading the story at the Emma E. Booker School in Sarasota, Florida, when he was informed of the ongoing terror attacks.

Honors and awards 
In 1984, Engelmann received an honorary doctorate from the Psychology Department of Western Michigan University. In 1994, he received the Fred S. Keller Award from the American Psychological Association’s Division of Experimental Analysis of Behavior. In 2000, the journal Remedial and Special Education named him as one of the 54 most influential people in the history of special education; and, in 2002, the Council of Scientific Society Presidents, awarded him the 2002 Award of Achievement in Education Research.

Selected publications

See also
Direct instruction
Behaviorism (philosophy of education)
Science Research Associates
20th-century educational theorists

References 

American education writers
People from Chicago
University of Oregon faculty
University of Illinois alumni
Special education in the United States
1931 births
2019 deaths